Serro  is a Brazilian municipality located in the state of Minas Gerais. 

Serro  may also refer to:

 Serro (musician), Kenyan singer, songwriter and performer of benga, afro-pop and jazz style
 Serro Ventoso, a civil parish in the municipality of Porto de Mós, Portugal

See also 
 Sero (disambiguation)
 Serra (disambiguation)